The 2001 Nokia New Zealand Film Awards were held on 10 November 2001 at the St James Theatre in Wellington, New Zealand. To better suit the release schedule of the film industry, the date of the awards ceremony was moved from a mid-year date of previous years to November. The awards were presented by the New Zealand Academy of Film and Television Arts and sponsored by Nokia New Zealand who also sponsored the Nokia New Zealand Film Awards Scholarship, awarded to a film student. The awards presentation featured a tribute to director John O'Shea.

Nominees and winners

Prizes were awarded in 21 categories. Road move Snakeskin won with most awards, with six, while Stickmen won four. 

Best Film
Snakeskin, Vanessa SheldrickStickmen, Michelle Turner
Rain, Philippa Campbell, John Toon, Robin ScholesBest DirectorHamish Rothwell, Stickmen
Gillian Ashurst, Snakeskin
Christine Jeffs, Rain

Best Actor
Scott Wills, Stickmen
Karl Urban, The Irrefutable Truth about Demons
Temuera Morrison, Crooked Earth

Best Actress
Sarah Peirse, Rain
Melanie Lynskey, Snakeskin
Vicky Haughton, Her Majesty

Best Supporting Actor
Alistair Browning, Rain
Paul Glover, Snakeskin
Lawrence Makoare, Crooked Earth

Best Supporting Actress
Luanne Gordon, Stickmen
Nancy Brunning, Crooked Earth
Liddy Holloway, Her Majesty

Best Juvenile Performer
Alicia Fulford-Wierzbicki, Rain
Emily Barclay, No-One Can Hear You
Sally Andrews, Her Majesty

Best Screenplay
Stickmen, Nick WardSnakeskin, Gillian Ashurst
The Irrefutable Truth about Demons, Glen StandringBest CinematographySnakeskin, Donald DuncanStickmen, Nigel Bluck
Rain, John ToonBest EditingSnakeskin, Cushla Dillon and Marcus DarcyThe Irrefutable Truth about Demons, Paul Sutorius
Stickmen, Owen Ferrier-KerrBest Original MusicSnakeskin, Leyton & Joost LangveldExposure, Bruce Lynch
Crooked Earth, James HallBest Contribution to a SoundtrackSnakeskin, Dave WhiteheadStickmen, Mike Hedges
Her Majesty, Tony JohnsonBest Make-UpHer Majesty, Debra EastSnakeskin, Vanessa Hurley
The Irrefutable Truth about Demons, Kareen Donalson
Stickmen, Debra EastBest Costume DesignHer Majesty, Lesley Burke-HardingStickmen, Nic Smillie
Rain, Kirsty CameronBest DesignHer Majesty, Kim SinclairStickmen, Neville Stevenson
Rain, Kirsty ClaytonBest Computer Generated ImagesSnakeskin, Peter HurnardThe Irrefutable Truth about Demons, Nigel Streeter
Stickmen, OktoberBest Digitally Mastered Feature FilmThe Waiting Game, Robert Rowe and Cristobal Araus LobosThe Shirt, John Laing and Ross Bevan
Back River Road, Peter TaitBest Short FilmJunk, Greg KingFalling Sparrows, Murray Keane
Camping With Camus, Alan ErsonBest Script for Short FilmCow, Michael BennettFalling Sparrows, Murray Keane
Room Tone, Charlie McClellanBest Technical Contribution to Short FilmJunk, John ChrystoffelsCow, Robert Gillies
Like An Angel, Dave WhiteheadBest Performance in a Short FilmJonathon Hardy, Camping With Camus
Lee Hartley, A New Way Home
Jed Brophy, Room Tone

References

New Zealand film awards
Film awards
New Zealand
November 2001 events in New Zealand